"Rubber Duckie" is a song sung by the Muppet character Ernie (voiced by Jim Henson) on Sesame Street. The song is named after Ernie's toy, a rubber ducky affectionately named Rubber Duckie.

The song, written by Jeff Moss and arranged by Joe Raposo, was first heard by children watching an episode of Sesame Street on February 25, 1970. It was popular enough to be recorded as a 45 rpm single and became a surprise mainstream hit, peaking at #16 on the Billboard Hot 100 on September 26, 1970. and it peaked at number 10 in Australia.

It was nominated for the Grammy Award for Best Recording for Children in 1971 but lost out to the album The Sesame Street Book & Record, which contained the song.  The song had follow-ups "Do De Rubber Duck", "D-U-C-K-I-E" and "The Honker Duckie Dinger Jamboree" was the centerpiece of 1988's "Put Down the Duckie", performed by Hoots the Owl but also featuring Ernie.

Composition
The song is written in the key of B-flat major.

Other recordings and performances

In 1971, one of The Irish Rovers sings the song in one sketch as part of one of the episodes of The Irish Rovers Show. Little Richard performed a rock-and-roll version of the song as a guest on a 1994 episode of Sesame Street. Bob McGrath recorded the song in his album, Bob's Favorite Street Songs. The song made a brief appearance in a scene in Three Men and a Little Lady, and during an episode of Whose Line Is It Anyway? Daveed Diggs, in costume as Mr. Noodle's Brother Mr. Noodle, performed a hip-hop infused version on Sesame Street's YouTube channel and it’s just like Shake a Tail Feather and When I See an Elephant Fly.

Little Richard has also performed a rockabilly-tinged version of the song, which can also be found on Sesame Street's official YouTube channel. 

Stride pianist Dick Wellstood included a performance of the song on his 1974 live album Walkin' with Wellstood. Jane Krakowski sings the song on her live album The Laziest Gal in Town.

A 2017 re-recorded version of the song features guest appearances by Tori Kelly, James Corden, Sia, Jason Derulo, Anthony Mackie and Daveed Diggs.

References

1970 singles
Novelty songs
Songs about fictional characters
Sesame Street songs
Columbia Records singles